Cryptolacerta (Ancient Greek and Latin for "Hidden lizard" – κρυπτς or crypto meaning "hidden" and lacerta meaning "lizard") is an extinct genus of Lacertoid lizard which lived during the Eocene epoch (Lutetian stage, about 47 million years ago) in what is now Germany. It is known from a nearly complete and articulated skeleton including the skull, which was found in the Messel/Messel Pit locality of Germany. Cryptolacerta was named by Johannes Müller, Christy A. Hipsley, Jason J. Head, Nikolay Kardjilov, André Hilger, Michael Wuttke and Robert R. Reisz in 2011 and the type species is Cryptolacerta hassiaca.  Cladistic analysis conducted by Müller et al. suggests that Cryptolacerta is a sister taxon to Amphisbaenia.

References 

Lacertoidea
Eocene lizards
Fossil taxa described in 2011
Fossils of Germany
Prehistoric reptile genera